Belá nad Cirochou is a large village and municipality in  Snina District in the Prešov Region of north-eastern Slovakia.

History 
In historical records the village was first mentioned in 1451.

Geography 
The municipality lies at an altitude of 207 metres and covers an area of 17.356 km2. It has a population of about 3315 people.

Genealogical resources 
The records for genealogical research are available at the state archive "Statny Archiv in Presov, Slovakia"

 Roman Catholic church records (births/marriages/deaths): 1786–1895 (parish B)
 Greek Catholic church records (births/marriages/deaths): 1825–1895 (parish B)

See also 
 List of municipalities and towns in Slovakia

References

External links 
 
 
https://web.archive.org/web/20070427022352/http://www.statistics.sk/mosmis/eng/run.html
Surnames of living people in Bela nad Cirochou

Villages and municipalities in Snina District